

Annual events

Attractions

References
City of Minneapolis, Annual Events
City of Minneapolis, Landmarks & Tours

External links
 General Minneapolis Events
 Family-friendly Minneapolis Events
 Minneapolis Attractions
 Minneapolis Fairs and Festivals

Culture of Minneapolis
Tourist attractions in Minneapolis
Minneapolis